Kent Briggs (born c. 1957) is a former American football coach. He served as the head football coach at Western Carolina University from 2002 to 2007, compiling a record of 22–43. A native of Asheville, North Carolina, Briggs played as a quarterback at A. C. Reynolds High School in Asheville and then at Western Carolina. He was the head football coach at Cherokee High School in Cherokee, North Carolina, from 2014 to 2018, leading his team to a 1A state title in 2017 and an overall record of 37–29.

Head coaching record

College

References

Year of birth missing (living people)
1950s births
Living people
American football quarterbacks
NC State Wolfpack football coaches
UConn Huskies football coaches
Western Carolina Catamounts football coaches
Western Carolina Catamounts football players
High school football coaches in North Carolina
Sportspeople from Asheville, North Carolina
Coaches of American football from North Carolina
Players of American football from North Carolina